Mirza Nabi (also Romanized as Mīrzā Nabī; also known as Deh-e Mīrzā Nabī) is a village in Margan Rural District, in the Central District of Hirmand County, Sistan and Baluchestan Province, Iran. At the 2006 census, its population was 141, in 34 families.

References 

Populated places in Hirmand County